Philip J. Haythornthwaite FRHistS (born 1951) is an author and historical consultant specialising in military history, uniforms, and equipment. While his main area of research is the Napoleonic Wars, his list of publications covers a wider period from the English Civil War through to 1939.

Works
Since 1973, Haythornthwaite has had over 80 books published, in addition to numerous articles and papers on military history. Much of this output through the publishers Orion Books and Osprey Publishing, is directed at the popular market and Haythornthwaite's writing has, beyond doubt, helped keep alive a general interest in history. However, his seminal works The Armies of Wellington and Redcoats, The British Soldiers of the Napoleonic Wars as well as Picton’s Division at Waterloo are serious works of research that show the author to be the equal of many professional historians.

Other notable work includes Haythornthwaite preparation of new editions of several well-known Peninsular War memoirs:
Life in Napoleon’s Army: the Memoirs of Captain Elzear Blaze 
In the Peninsula with a French Hussar: Memoirs of the War of the French in Spain.

Awards
Haythornthwaite is a Fellow of the Royal Historical Society and a Member of the British Commission for Military History. In 2015 he was awarded a Certificate in Recognition of Lifetime Achievement jointly by the BCMH and the Peninsular War 200 organisation.

Select bibliography
Orion Books

 The Armies of Wellington is the most comprehensive account ever published of the effect of this one man on the British Army during the Napoleonic era.

Osprey Publishing 35 titles between 1983 and 2016

Pen & Sword Books

In this landmark book, Haythornthwaite traces the career of a British soldier from enlistment, through the key stages of his path through the military system, including combat, all the way to his eventual discharge.
He concentrates on the famous Fifth Division, commanded by Sir Thomas Picton, which was a key element in Wellington's Reserve. The experiences of this division form a microcosm of those of the entire army.

Other published works

Collaborations
With Jack Cassin-Scott and John Fabb:

References

British military historians
Historians of the Napoleonic Wars
1951 births
Living people
Fellows of the Royal Historical Society